Schulzendal is a town in Ehlanzeni District Municipality in the Mpumalanga province of South Africa, 31 km south-east of Kaapmuiden.

References

Populated places in the Nkomazi Local Municipality